Events from the year 1804 in Sweden

Incumbents
 Monarch – Gustav IV Adolf

Events

 - Jöns Jacob Berzelius discover cerium.
 - Sofia Lovisa Gråå appointed principal of the Royal Dramatic Training Academy.

Births
 28 January - Carl Johan Billmark, painter  (died 1870)
 8 May - Lapp-Nils, Sami musician   (died 1870)
 19 August - Christina Enbom, opera singer   (died 1880)
 - Anna Johansdotter Norbäck,  founder and leader of the religious movement Annaniterna  (died 1879)
 - Sophia Magdalena Gardelius, damask weaver (died 1881)

Deaths
 4 April - Abraham de Broen, actor  (born 1759)
  - Anna Brita Wendelius, member of the Royal Swedish Academy of Music and the Utile Dulci  (born 1741)
  - Marguerite Morel, ballerina, actress and singer  (born 1737)
  - Gustaf Björnram, mystic and spiritualist medium (born 1746)

References

 
Years of the 19th century in Sweden
Sweden